Weekend of Horrors was traditionally a tri-annual (with occasionally more) traveling convention which focuses on horror films. Formerly produced in partnership with Creation Entertainment, the Weekend of Horrors show is now owned exclusively by Fangoria Magazine and is held once annually in Los Angeles, California.

The convention also deals in areas of the horror genre outside filmmaking, as well as exploitation, science fiction, and fantasy entertainment.

Fangoria magazine editor Tony Timpone was the Master of Ceremonies and Co-Producer of the shows during its time with Creation Entertainment.

Convention layout 
Weekend of Horrors conventions are typically composed of three areas:
 The Dealers' Area, which is made up primarily of vendors selling horror-themed merchandise and booths advertising films,
 The Auditorium, where panels and speeches are given for the duration of the convention,
 And The Screening Room, where new independent and mainstream horror films are screened via digital projection.

Some conventions also have Film Fests (occurring at neighboring theaters) and a Cocktail, or more recently, Dessert Party, where guests can casually mingle with horror personalities after-hours.

Locations and dates 
The Weekend of Horrors began in 1985, with its name and likeness owned by Creation Entertainment.

Starting with the 2006 Weekend of Horrors in Secaucus, New Jersey, the convention expanded from a two-day (Saturday and Sunday) event, to a three-day (including Friday). This expanded schedule, common for most current conventions, was continued for all future Weekend of Horrors.

Until 2008, Weekend of Horrors occurred annually in Rosemont, Illinois (Winter), Los Angeles, California (Spring), and New York City, New York (formerly Secaucus, New Jersey) (Summer), with an additional destination chosen based on the year (in 2008, Austin, Texas, was added to the circuit).

In 2009 Fangoria broke ties with Creation; the convention is now produced solely by Fangoria and is held once annually in Los Angeles, California.

Notable guests 

Notable guests at Weekend of Horrors conventions have included:

45 Grave
David Arquette
Lucio Fulci
Clive Barker
Reggie Bannister
Lamberto Bava
Thora Birch
Uwe Boll
Doug Bradley
Bruce Campbell
Jeffrey Combs
Wes Craven
Frank Darabont
Shannon Elizabeth
Robert Englund
R. Lee Ermey
Fashion Bomb
Nathan Fillion
Ken Foree
Corey Haim
Danielle Harris
Doug Jones
Lloyd Kaufman
Adrienne King
Stephen King
Kristina Klebe
Harry Knowles
Heather Langenkamp
G Tom Mac
James Marsters
Bill Moseley
Russell Mulcahy
Mushroomhead
Paul Naschy
Jack Nicholson
Betsy Palmer
Ron Perlman
Robert Rodriguez
Michael Roesch
George A. Romero
Eli Roth
John Saxon
Peter Scheerer
Arnold Schwarzenegger
Shawnee Smith
Dee Snider
Quentin Tarantino
Tony Todd
Caroline Williams
Fred Williamson

References

External links 
 Fangoria's Weekend of Horrors

Horror conventions
Science fiction conventions in the United States
Fangoria